Rapanea longifolia is a species of plant in the family Primulaceae.

References

longifolia
Flora of French Polynesia
Taxonomy articles created by Polbot
Taxobox binomials not recognized by IUCN